Steubenville is a city in and the county seat of Jefferson County, Ohio, United States. Located along the Ohio River 33 miles west of Pittsburgh, it had a population of 18,161 at the 2020 census. The city's name is derived from Fort Steuben, a 1786 fort that sat within the city's current limits and was named for Prussian military officer Baron Friedrich Wilhelm von Steuben. It is a principal city of the Weirton–Steubenville metropolitan area, which had a 2020 population of 116,903 residents.

Steubenville's nickname is the "City of Murals", after its more than 25 downtown murals. Both the campuses of Franciscan University of Steubenville and Eastern Gateway Community College are in Steubenville. Historically, it was known as the birthplace and home town of Edwin Stanton, Secretary of War during the American Civil War. It is also known as the city where legendary entertainer Dean Martin of the Rat Pack was born and raised. It has recently attracted attention for the Steubenville Nutcracker Village, an annual Christmastime event.

History

In 1786–87, soldiers of the First American Regiment under Major Jean François Hamtramck built Fort Steuben to protect the government surveyors mapping the land west of the Ohio River, and named the fort in honor of Baron Friedrich Wilhelm von Steuben. When the surveyors completed their task a few years later, the fort was abandoned. In the meantime, settlers had built homes around the fort; they named their settlement Steubenville. The name Steubenville was derived from Fort Steuben to honor Baron von Steuben (the fort was named for the Baron). The town was sometimes referred to as La Belle City, a franglais interpretation of "The Beautiful City".

On July 29, 1797, Jefferson County was organized by a proclamation of Governor Arthur St. Clair, and Steubenville was selected as the county seat. It was platted in the same year by Bezaliel Wells and James Ross, the city's co-founders.

On March 1, 1803, Ohio was admitted to the Union as the 17th state. During the first half of the nineteenth century, Steubenville was primarily a port town, and the rest of the county was small villages and farms. Steubenville received a city charter in 1851. In 1856, Frazier, Kilgore and Company erected a rolling mill (the forerunner of steel mills) and the Steubenville Coal and Mining Company sank a coal shaft. The city was a stop along the Pittsburgh, Cincinnati, Chicago and St. Louis Railroad, which connected Pittsburgh to Chicago and St. Louis.

The Steubenville Female Seminary, also known as Beatty's Seminary for Young Ladies or Steubenville Seminary, was an early private educational institution for women founded by Presbyterian minister Charles Clinton Beatty in 1829. It was closed in 1898 and the buildings were eventually razed for part of what is now Ohio State Route 7.

In 1946, the College of Steubenville was founded by the Franciscan Friars of the Third Order Regular. In 1980, its name was changed to University of Steubenville, and finally in 1985 to Franciscan University of Steubenville. In 1966, the Jefferson County Technical Institute was founded. In 1977, its name was changed to Jefferson Technical College. In 1995, it became a community college and was renamed Jefferson Community College. In 2009, the college expanded its service district by three Ohio counties, and was renamed again: Eastern Gateway Community College.

The city gained international attention in late 2012 from the events surrounding the Steubenville High School rape case, which occurred in August 2012. The case was first covered by The New York Times that December, followed by the computer hacker group Anonymous later that month, and the subsequent coverage of the trials in late 2013. The case was significant in the extensive use of social media as evidence and in opening a national discussion on the concept of rape culture.

Geography

Steubenville is located at  (40.359, −80.614). The city lies along the Ohio River, with the city spreading west from the floodplains to the hills that surround the city. It lies within the ecoregion of the Western Allegheny Plateau.

Climate
The climate in this area is characterized by hot summers and relatively cold winters and evenly distributed precipitation throughout the year. As detailed in a March 2022 guide from the Climate Receiver Places Project at the PLACE initiative, Steubenville is a climate resilient geography based on its relatively low climate change risk exposure. According to the Köppen Climate Classification system, Steubenville has a humid continental climate, abbreviated "Dfa" on climate maps.

Demographics

The city's population peaked in 1940 at 37,651. After large declines for many decades, the population decline stabilized some, with the 2010 and 2020 censuses showing the smallest declines in any decade since the peak. This trend is reflected in the US Census Bureau's estimate of the 2020 population from its American Community Survey of 17,882 being lower than the actual count in the 2020 census of 18,161, an increase compared to the estimate of 279. This is similar to the situation in 2010 when the estimated population of the American Community Survey was 18,578, but the actual count in the 2020 census was 18,659, an increase of 81.

Steubenville is a principal city of the Weirton–Steubenville metropolitan area and is part of the larger Pittsburgh–New Castle–Weirton combined statistical area. From 1980 to 2000, census figures show that the Weirton–Steubenville metro population decreased faster than that of any other urban area in the United States.

2010 census
As of the census of 2010, there were 18,659 people, 7,548 households, and 4,220 families residing in the city. The racial makeup of the city was 79.0% White, 15.9% African American, 0.2% Native American, 0.8% Asian, 0.6% from other races, and 3.5% from two or more races. Hispanic or Latino of any race were 2.4% of the population.

There were 7,548 households, of which 25.3% had children under the age of 18 living with them, 34.8% were married couples living together, 16.2% had a female householder with no husband present, 4.8% had a male householder with no wife present, and 44.1% were non-families. 37.1% of all households were made up of individuals, and 15.7% had someone living alone who was 65 years of age or older. The average household size was 2.22 and the average family size was 2.91.

The median age in the city was 38.8 years. 20.3% of residents were under the age of 18; 16.1% were between the ages of 18 and 24; 20.3% were from 25 to 44; 25.9% were from 45 to 64; and 17.5% were 65 years of age or older. The gender makeup of the city was 46.1% male and 53.9% female.

2000 census
As of the census of 2000, there were 19,015 people, 8,342 households, and 4,880 families residing in the city. The population density was 1,842.2 people per square mile (711.4/km2). There were 9,449 housing units at an average density of 915.4 per square mile (353.5/km2). The racial makeup of the city was 79.55% White, 17.25% African American, 0.22% Native American, 0.73% Asian, 0.01% Pacific Islander, 0.53% from other races, and 1.70% from two or more races. Hispanic or Latino of any race were 0.97% of the population.

There were 8,342 households, out of which 23.4% had children under the age of 18 living with them, 40.2% were married couples living together, 14.9% had a female householder, and 41.5% were non-families. 36.4% of all households were made up of individuals, and 18.0% had someone living alone who was 65 years of age or older. The average household size was 2.19 and the average family size was 2.86.

In the city, the population was spread out, with 21.2% under the age of 18, 8.1% from 18 to 24, 24.3% from 25 to 44, 24.2% from 45 to 64, and 22.2% who were 65 years of age or older. The median age was 43 years. For every 100 females, there were 85.6 males. For every 100 females age 18 and over, there were 80.8 males.

The median income for a household in the city was $26,516, and the median income for a family was $36,597. Males had a median income of $36,416 versus $21,819 for females. The per capita income for the city was $17,830. About 15.3% of families and 20.4% of the population were below the poverty line, including 29.2% of those under the age of 18 and 11.0% of those aged 65 and older.

Religion
Like most cities of comparable age and size, Steubenville has well-established Orthodox Christian, Roman Catholic, Protestant, and until 2013, Jewish communities.   Steubenville is the seat of the Roman Catholic Roman Catholic Diocese of Steubenville.   Holy Name Church was selected as the Cathedral in 1944 when the Southeastern part of the Roman Catholic Diocese of Columbus Columbus Diocese was made into the Diocese of Steubenville.  Recent financial difficulties resulted in a proposal to re-merge the diocese with the Diocese of Columbus, but the proposal proved very contentious and has been tabled for further study.

Economy

Steubenville and the communities that surround it, especially Weirton, West Virginia, have experienced sluggish economies since the steel industry waned during the 1980s. Corporations such as Weirton Steel have had to reduce their workforce in order to become more efficient and competitive against other steel producers and lower steel prices worldwide.

Starting in 2014, the Harmonium Project and numerous others partners began a series of street festivals called First Fridays on Fourth to build community and generate interest and economic activity downtown. More recently there have been several new businesses opened Downtown on 4th Street, including Drosselmeyer’s Nutcracker Shoppe, Leonardo’s Coffeehouse and the Steubenville Popcorn Co.

The new Findlay Connector has been built in western Pennsylvania as a toll-access highway between Pittsburgh International Airport at Interstate 376 and U.S. Route 22 in northwestern Washington County. Travel time between the Pittsburgh International Airport and the city of Steubenville is now approximately 25 minutes.

Steubenville is located near two large shale formations: the Marcellus and Utica formations.

Arts and culture

Historic sites

Fort Steuben, located downtown on South Third Street, is a reconstructed 18th century fort on its original location overlooking the Ohio River. Built in 1787 to protect the government surveyors of the Seven Ranges of the Northwest Territory, Fort Steuben housed 150 men of the 1st American Regiment. The non-profit organization that worked to rebuild the fort also developed the surrounding block into Fort Steuben Park that includes the Veterans Memorial Fountain and the Berkman Amphitheater. The Fort Steuben Visitors center is home to the Museum Shop and the Steubenville Convention & Visitors Bureau and is an official site on the Ohio River Scenic Byway.

Adjacent to the fort is the First Federal Land Office with its original logs from 1801. After the Ohio country was surveyed, it could be sold or given away as land grants; the settlers brought their deeds to be registered at the Land Office to David Hoge, the Registrar of Lands and Titles for the Northwest Territory.

"Ohio Valley Steelworker" Statue was created by artist Dimitri Akis as a tribute to the Ohio Valley Steelworkers. The life-size figure carries a long-handled dipping ladle and is wearing the hooded fire-proof suit worn in the steel mills. The statue was located at the junction of Hwy 22 (University Blvd) and Hwy 7 (Dean Martin Blvd). In the fall of 2014, the statue was moved to its new home, displayed on South Fourth Street at the site of the Public Library of Steubenville and Jefferson County.

There is a statue downtown commemorating Edwin Stanton, President Abraham Lincoln's secretary of war. Stanton was born and raised in Steubenville.

Actor, singer and comedian Dean Martin was born and raised in Steubenville, and in addition to an annual Dean Martin Festival and a Dean Martin Room at the Jefferson County Historical Museum and Library.

Libraries
Steubenville has two public lending libraries, the Carnegie Library of Steubenville and Schiappa Branch Library.

Murals

Steubenville's nickname is the "City of Murals", because there are more than 25 downtown murals.
There are numerous murals, markers and a walking tour in Steubenville, many paying homage to Dean Martin.
There is also a mural (located along Washington Street in Steubenville, OH) dedicated to two Tuskegee Airmen who were brothers, John Ellis Edwards and Jerome Edwards. Both were Tuskegee airmen.

Steubenville Nutcracker Village
In 2015, two local businessmen started a Christmas-themed festival, the Steubenville Nutcracker Village and Advent Market. The event is centered around a collection of 150 life-size nutcracker sculptures spread throughout Fort Steuben Park in downtown Steubenville. The Nutcracker Village is free and open to the public 24 hours a day and generally runs from the Tuesday before Thanksgiving to Epiphany Sunday in early January.

Live entertainment and a German-style Advent Market featuring local artisans and craftsmen, as well as hot food and drink vendors, runs each weekend through the month of December in Fort Steuben Park to coincide with the Nutcracker Village event. The popularity of the Nutcracker Village since its inception has inspired other nutcracker-themed ventures in the City of Steubenville, including Drosselmeyer's Nutcracker Shoppe, a year-round Christmas shop in downtown Steubenville, and Wooden Hearts Follies, a locally-written and performed musical centered around characters from the event. The Nutcracker Village attracted over 40,000 visitors in 2017 and is credited with bringing new life to Steubenville's downtown area.

Sports
Between 1887 and 1913, a team known as the Steubenville Stubs sparsely played minor league baseball  at various times in the Ohio State League, Interstate League, Ohio–Pennsylvania League and Pennsylvania–Ohio–Maryland League. The Steubenville Stampede was a member of the Continental Indoor Football League from 2006–2007.

Government

City officials

Politics

The City of Steubenville is part of the 6th Congressional district of Ohio and is represented by Bill Johnson. The 6th district is the longest US House district in Ohio and runs along the southeast state borders of Ohio.

Policing, Civil Rights Lawsuits, and Reform
In 1997, the U.S. Department of Justice alleged that the city and police force had subjected numerous individuals to "excessive force, false arrests, charges, and reports" and had engaged in practices regarding "improper stops, searches, and seizures". The report from the Department also stated that excessive force was levied against individuals who witnessed incidents of police misconduct, and against those who were known critics of the city and its police force. Those individuals were also falsely detained if the city and the police agreed that they were "likely to complain of abuse". It further stated that the officers involved falsified reports and tampered with official police recorders so that "misconduct would not be recorded".

As a result, the city's police force became the second city in the United States to sign a consent decree with the federal government due to an excessive number of civil rights lawsuits. The decree was signed on September 4, 1997, under the "pattern or practice" provision. Under this agreement, the city agreed to improve the training of its police officers, implement new guidelines and procedures, establish an internal affairs unit, and establish an "early warning system".

Based on reformed use of force policies and improved police training requirements implemented by the city and its police department, the consent decree with the U.S. Department of Justice ended on March 4, 2005. These reforms and improvements were reviewed by the City Council in 2020, and the city manager outlined use of force policies, data, and training that showed continuing improvements.

Speed camera lawsuit
The speed camera program began in 2005 and earned the city $600,000 in revenues, as nearly 7,000 tickets (at $85 each) were issued during that time period. In March 2006, the Jefferson County Court of Common Pleas ruled that the city ordinance of supporting the speed camera program was illegal and unconstitutional. The city refused to remove the cameras, however, because it stated it was "bound by contract to continue the services" of Traffipax, Inc., the US subsidiary of ROBOT Visual Systems, a German corporation. Despite attempts to remove the cameras, the city continued to defy the judge's order and reinstated an identical ordinance to continue issuing citations. Councilman at Large Michael Hernon cast the sole dissenting vote against reinstating the traffic cameras.

In mid-2006, an attorney filed a class-action lawsuit against the city of Steubenville for illegally collecting fines and generating unnecessary revenue from motorists. He won the case in December 2007 and the city was forced to refund thousands of tickets totaling $258,000. Stern also gathered enough signatures from the residents of the city to put forth a referendum that posed the question of whether the city's ordinance authorizing the speed camera program should continue. On November 8, 2006, city residents voted to end the city's speed camera program with a 76.2 percent majority.

Education

Postsecondary
Steubenville is home to two institutions of higher education. The Franciscan University of Steubenville is a private, four-year university affiliated with the Roman Catholic Church. It was founded in 1946.

The second institution is Eastern Gateway Community College. It is a public, two-year college that opened its doors in 1968; its service district includes Columbiana, Mahoning, and Trumbull Counties as well as Jefferson County.

On July 24, 2012, after being threatened with a lawsuit from the atheist Freedom from Religion Foundation, the Steubenville city council decided to remove the image of Franciscan University from its town logo rather than pay for a lawsuit. The city later proposed a logo that included a chapel and cross.

Primary and secondary
Public schools in Steubenville are operated by the Steubenville City School District. There are a total of five schools in the district: Wells Academy, West Pugliese, Garfield, Harding Middle, and Steubenville High School. A portion of far western Steubenville is served by the Indian Creek Local School District. Several private schools are located in Steubenville. The Roman Catholic Diocese of Steubenville operates Bishop John King Mussio Central Elementary School, Bishop John King Mussio Central Junior High School and Steubenville Catholic Central High School.

Media 
A part of the  Wheeling–Steubenville media market, the city is home to the market's NBC and FOX affiliate, WTOV-TV. In print, it is home to the daily Herald-Star newspaper, which traces its history to 1806.

The radio station WIXZ 950 AM has broadcast Oldies music from the city since 1974. Previously, Steubenville also has radio stations WSSS-LP and WSTV (AM)..

Notable people

References

External links

 
 

 
Cities in Ohio
Cities in Jefferson County, Ohio
County seats in Ohio